Leniszki  is a village in the administrative district of Gmina Czarnożyły, within Wieluń County, Łódź Voivodeship, in central Poland.

The village has a population of 90.

References

Leniszki